The Cornwall Heritage Trust (CHT) is an organisation which owns and manages historic sites in Cornwall, UK. It was founded in 1985.

List of managed sites
The Trust owns and manages a number of sites:
Trevanion Culverhouse
Castle an Dinas
Sancreed Beacon
Treffry Viaduct
Dupath Well
Hurlers Stone Circles
Tregiffian Burial Chamber
St Breock Downs Monolith
King Doniert's Stone
Trethevy Quoit
Carn Euny

References

Private companies limited by guarantee of the United Kingdom
Charities based in Cornwall
1985 establishments in the United Kingdom
Archaeological organizations